Hans Hägele (13 July 1940 – 18 October 2010) was a German professional footballer who played as a striker. He later became a football agent.

Career
Hägele played for VfL Sindelfingen, VfR Heilbronn and Fortuna Düsseldorf.

Hägele later became a football agent, and helped engineer Armin Veh's move from Borussia Mönchengladbach to St. Gallen in 1983.

He was also a witness at Christoph Daum's trial for cocaine abuse.

Death
Hägele jumped from the Koersch Valley Bridge on 18 October 2010, at the age of 70. He left no suicide note.

References

1940 births
2010 deaths
German footballers
Footballers from Stuttgart
Fortuna Düsseldorf players
Suicides by jumping in Germany
Association football forwards
2010 suicides